Gema Isabel Martínez López (born 28 November 1950) is a Mexican politician affiliated with the Institutional Revolutionary Party. As of 2014 she served as Deputy of the LIX Legislature of the Mexican Congress as a plurinominal representative.

References

1950 births
Living people
Politicians from Mexico City
Women members of the Chamber of Deputies (Mexico)
Members of the Chamber of Deputies (Mexico)
Institutional Revolutionary Party politicians
21st-century Mexican politicians
21st-century Mexican women politicians
Deputies of the LIX Legislature of Mexico